"Razor's Edge" is a song written by Ian Morrison and Shane Howard and recorded by Australian band Goanna. The song was released in March 1983, as the second and final single from the band's debut studio album, Spirit of Place. "Razor's Edge" peaked at number 36 on the Australian Kent Music Report.

Track listing 
 7" WEA (7-259963)
Side A: "Razor's Edge" - 4:06
Side B: "On the Platform" - 4:59

Charts

Cover versions
 In 2018, The Screaming Jets covered the song on their album Gotcha Covered.

References

1979 songs
1983 singles